Muurame is a municipality of Finland, located  south-west of Jyväskylä. Muurame itself is located between two lakes, Lake Päijänne and Lake Muuratjärvi. These two lakes are connected to each other via River Muurame. All together there are 37 lakes in Muurame. Biggest lakes beside Päijänne are Muuratjärvi and Lake Kuusjärvi. River Muurame streams through the population center of Muurame. Muurame was founded in 1921.

The Muurame church is of Alvar Aalto's design, being his first church design to be completed in 1929. It was comprehensively restored in 2016 to its original design.

Name 
Muurame is a dialectal word referring to the cloudberry, which also can be seen in the municipal coat of arms. Similar toponyms nearby include Muuratsalo, Muuratjärvi, Muuramenlampi and Muuratharju.

History 
Muurame was first mentioned as Murame ärmarch in 1554 when it was a part of the Jämsä parish. In the 18th century, the village was variously known as Muranjärvi, Murame and Muratjärvi.

Korpilahti, including Muurame, was separated from Jämsä in 1861. Muurame was in turn separated from Korpilahti in 1921. Plans to separate Säynätsalo from Muurame appeared in 1922, but the separation happened two years later in 1924. Lehtisaari and northern Muuratsalo (incl. Haikka) remained parts of Muurame until 1935.

Notable people

Athletes 
 Emilia Nyström, Finnish beach volleyball
 Erika Nyström, Finnish beach volleyball
 Jussi Pesonen, ice hockey player
 Harri Pesonen, ice hockey player
 Mikko Ronkainen, Freestyle skier

Twinnings
 Alatskivi Parish, Estonia
 Vinje, Norway

See also
Muuratsalo

References

External links

Municipality of Muurame – Official website 

 
Populated places established in 1921